The following are the national records in athletics in Tonga maintained by Tonga's national athletics federation: Tonga Athletic Association (TAA).

Outdoor

Key to tables:
 

ht = hand timing

# = not recognised by federation

A = affected by altitude

a = aided road course according to IAAF rule 260.28

OT = oversized track (> 200m in circumference)

Men

Women

†: UK citizen married to Tongan.

Indoor

Men

Women

References

External links

Tonga
Records
Athletics